Binyamin Mintz (12 January 1903 – 30 May 1961) was an Israeli politician who served briefly as Minister of Postal Services from July 1960 until his death.

Biography
Born in Łódź in the Russian Empire (today in Poland), Mintz studied in a Hasidic Ger school, and was a member of Young Agudat Yisrael. He made aliyah to Mandatory Palestine in 1925, and worked in construction and as a printer.

In 1933, he joined Poalei Agudat Yisrael, and was later a member of the Provisional State Council. In 1949, he was elected to the first Knesset on the list of the United Religious Front (an alliance of the four main religious parties). Re-elected in 1951, 1955, and 1959, he was appointed Minister of Postal Services by David Ben-Gurion on 17 July 1960, serving until his death the following May.

The village of Yad Binyamin, established in 1962, was named in his honour.

External links
 

1903 births
1961 deaths
Members of the 1st Knesset (1949–1951)
Members of the 2nd Knesset (1951–1955)
Members of the 3rd Knesset (1955–1959)
Members of the 4th Knesset (1959–1961)
Polish emigrants to Mandatory Palestine
Poalei Agudat Yisrael politicians
Religious Torah Front politicians
United Religious Front politicians
Burials at Nahalat Yitzhak Cemetery
Ministers of Communications of Israel